Marie E. Machacek is an astrophysicist conducting research in the High Energy Astrophysics Division of the Smithsonian Astrophysical Observatory. She earned a BA in physics and mathematics from Coe College, in 1969; an MS in physics from the University of Michigan, in 1970; and a PhD in physics from the University of Iowa, in 1973.  Her current research explores interacting galaxies and the evolution of galaxies in galaxy groups and clusters. She is also the current coordinator for the SAO Astronomy Intern Program.

Machacek was co-author of a Center for Astrophysics  Harvard & Smithsonian study concerning galaxy NGC 5195 presented in January 2016 at the 227th meeting of the American Astronomical Society (AAS).

Machacek was an Alumni Fellow at the University of Michigan 1974-77.  She was on the physics faculty of Northeastern University, 1979-2002.  In 2003-2004 she was a Fellow of the Radcliffe Institute for Advanced Study at Harvard University.

References

Living people
Year of birth missing (living people)
American astrophysicists
American women physicists
21st-century American women